Renaissance Men is the ninth studio album by The Wildhearts. It was released on 3 May 2019 and was the band's first album since 2009. The album also reunites a Wildhearts lineup that had not recorded together since 1995, including newly returned bassist Danny McCormack.

Reception
Renaissance Men was named "Album of the Week" by LA Weekly, which called the album the best release by the Wildhearts since 1995. The album also received positive reviews from Sputnikmusic, Maximum Volume, Pure Rawk, and Classic Rock Magazine. Renaissance Men is the band's second highest charting album, settling at number 11 in the UK Albums Chart.

Track listing
All songs written by Ginger Wildheart except "Little Flower" by CJ Wildheart.

Personnel 
 Ginger Wildheart – guitar, vocals
 C. J. Wildheart – guitar, vocals
 Ritch Battersby – drums
 Danny McCormack – bass, vocals

References 

The Wildhearts albums
2019 albums